Pedro José Pidal y Bernaldo de Quirós, 1st Marquess of Villaviciosa de Asturias, MP (2 November 1870 – 17 November 1941) was a Spanish peer, politician, mountaineer, writer, famed hunter and Olympic medalist. A visionary in the field of conservationism, he engineered the creation of Picos de Europa National Park in 1918 and was the first person to reach the summit of Naranjo de Bulnes, in 1904.

Pidal took second place in pigeon shooting at the 1900 Summer Olympics, an event now considered unofficial (the IOC has never decided which events were "Olympic" and which were not). As a politician, he was a member of parliament for Belmonte de Miranda and Luarca, and was made senator for life in 1914.

Early life 
He was born in Somió as the first child of 12, son of Alejandro Pidal, who was President of the Congress of Deputies, Minister of Development and Director of the Royal Spanish Academy. His mother was Ignacia Bernaldo de Quirós, the daughter of the 7th Marquess of Campo Sagrado.

Hunting

During his hunting career, he bagged five Cantabrian brown bears, a species he was one of the biggest experts in. Pidal was predominantly a mountain hunter, and enjoyed stalking rebecos and sarrios as well.

He is one of only four who have hunted all big-game species of the Spanish fauna (including the Iberian lynx and bear), the other three being the 11th Marquess of Valdueza, Carlos Rein and Infanta Alicia of Spain.

He died in Gijón on 17 November 1941.

Issue 
On 10 October 1892, he married Jacqueline Guilhou, the daughter of Jean Antoine Numa Guilhou, a prominent French businessman. The ceremony took place at the chapel of the Mieres steel factory. They had five children:

María Pidal y Guilhou
Santiago Pidal y Guilhou, 2nd Marquess of Villaviciosa de Asturias (1894-1962)
Pedro Pidal y Guilhou
Alejandro Pidal y Guilhou
Enrique Pidal y Guilhou

Titles 
 1st Marquess of Villaviciosa de Asturias

Selected works 
 La Caza del Oso en Asturias, KRK Ediciones, Oviedo, 1900.
 Picos de Europa: Contribución al Estudio de las Montañas Españolas, Ediciones Noega, Madrid, 1918.

See also
List of big-game hunters

References

Bibliography 

1870 births
1941 deaths
People from Gijón
Marquesses of Spain
Spanish nobility
Members of the Congress of Deputies (Spain)
Spanish mountain climbers
Spanish conservationists
Spanish male sport shooters
Hunters
Olympic shooters of Spain
Olympic silver medalists for Spain
Shooters at the 1900 Summer Olympics
Medalists at the 1900 Summer Olympics
Olympic medalists in shooting